The Texas Tech Red Raiders football team has appeared in 40 post-season bowl games since the team's inaugural season in 1925. Texas Tech's rich bowl tradition ranks 20th in all-time bowl appearances and has set many bowl game attendance records. The Red Raiders have an overall bowl record of 16 wins, 23 losses, and 1 tie.

Texas Tech's first post-season bowl game was at the conclusion of the 1937 season, when the Red Raiders played in the 1938 Sun Bowl in El Paso, Texas against the West Virginia Mountaineers. Texas Tech's most recent bowl game appearance was the 2021 Liberty Bowl victory against the Mississippi State Bulldogs. Nine of Texas Tech's 39 bowl game bids have been to the Sun Bowl, the most appearances by any team to the second-oldest college football bowl game.

Attendance records 
The Red Raiders' fans have set attendance records at 10 bowl games, including the team's first bowl game appearance in the 1938 Sun Bowl. Although 8 of the 10 attendance records were eventually broken, attendance records from 2 bowl game appearances, the 2004 Pacific Life Holiday Bowl and 2009 AT&T Cotton Bowl Classic, remain unbroken. The 2009 AT&T Cotton Bowl Classic's attendance record of 88,175 was the second-most attended bowl game of the 2008–09 bowl game season.

List of bowl games 
Statistics correct as of the end of the 2019 NCAA Division I FBS football season

Notes 
Bowl game

Head coach

References 
General

Specific

Texas Tech Red Raiders

Red Raiders
Texas Tech Red Raiders bowl games